Zeng Siyu (2 February 1911 – December 31, 2012) was a People's Liberation Army lieutenant general and People's Republic of China politician. He was born in Xinfeng County, Jiangxi Province. He was a veteran of the Second Sino-Japanese War and the Chinese Civil War. He was Communist Party of China Committee Secretary and Governor of Hubei Province.

1911 births
2012 deaths
People's Republic of China politicians from Jiangxi
Chinese Communist Party politicians from Jiangxi
People's Liberation Army generals from Jiangxi
Chinese centenarians
Men centenarians
Politicians from Ganzhou
Governors of Hubei